The Naval Air Station Wildwood Aviation Museum is an aviation museum located at the Cape May Airport in Lower Township, in Cape May County, New Jersey, United States.

History
The Cape May Airport, which hosts the museum, was originally constructed by the U.S. Navy from 1941 to 1942. Commissioned in April 1943 as Naval Air Station Rio Grande, the field was so named due to its proximity to the community of Rio Grande, New Jersey. Due to problems with mail, telegram, and telephone service, caused in part by confusion with Rio Grande City, Texas, the Navy opted to rename the airfield as Naval Air Station Wildwood in June 1943.

In the mid-1990s, Dr. Joseph Salvatore purchased Hangar #1, which was then dilapidated.

The museum is located in the airport's Hangar #1, which is typical of the design of many U.S. Navy and U.S. Marine Corps aircraft hangars of the 1940s, many of which are still in use today at both active Naval Air Stations, Marine Corps Air Stations and Coast Guard Air Stations across the United States, as well as other civilian airports that formerly served as air stations. The museum's hangar is currently listed on the National Register of Historic Places.

The museum's aircraft collection focuses on World War II, when the U.S. Navy conducted training operations at the site, but also includes more recent vintage military aircraft from the Cold War, the Korean War, the Vietnam War and the post-Cold War period.

The museum suffered damage from Hurricane Sandy in 2012.

A Humvee that the United States Coast Guard used in Afghanistan was placed on loan to the museum in 2014.

In 2022, an R-2800 WWII aircraft engine recovered from the ocean was donated to the museum. Later that same year, the museum had a new roof installed.

Aircraft on display

The museum's collection includes:

 Air & Space 18A 18-59
 Bell AH-1 Cobra 67-15633
 Bell EH-1X Iroquois 69-15905
 Bell UH-1M Iroquois
 Boeing-Stearman N2S-3 Kaydet 38073
 Boeing-Stearman PT-17 Kaydet 40-1825
 Cessna 150
 Cessna OE-2 Bird Dog 140090
 Douglas A-4A Skyhawk 142180
 General Dynamics F-16B Fighting Falcon 78-0088
 Grumman F-14B Tomcat 161422
 Grumman F6F-3 Hellcat
 Grumman TBM-3E Avenger 86180
 Hughes OH-6 Cayuse 67-16638
 Lockheed T-33A Shooting Star 10055
 Lockheed T-33A Shooting Star 10056
 McCulloch J-2
 Mikoyan-Gurevich MiG-15 1961
 North American T-28C Trojan 140557
 Northrop F-5E Tiger II 741572
 Sikorsky HH-52A Seaguard 1462
 Vultee BT-13 Valiant 42-88708
 V-2 rocket – replica

See also
 List of museums in New Jersey
 List of aerospace museums
 List of maritime museums in the United States

References

External links

Aerospace museums in New Jersey
Maritime museums in New Jersey
Military and war museums in New Jersey
Wildwood
Museums in Cape May County, New Jersey
Museums established in 1997
1997 establishments in New Jersey
Lower Township, New Jersey